The 1978 Dwars door België was the 33rd edition of the Dwars door Vlaanderen cycle race and was held on 2 April 1978. The race started and finished in Waregem. The race was won by Jos Schipper.

General classification

References

1978
1978 in road cycling
1978 in Belgian sport
April 1978 sports events in Europe